George Taylor MacNutt (19 December 1865 – 24 May 1937) was a Canadian businessman and politician. MacNutt served as a Conservative member of the House of Commons of Canada. He was born in Stewiacke, Nova Scotia and became a contractor and lumber merchant.

MacNutt attended public school in Nova Scotia, then Truro Academy. He campaigned in the 1911 Nova Scotia provincial election for a seat at Guysborough riding but was not successful.

He was first elected to Parliament at the Colchester riding in the 1925 general election. MacNutt was re-elected there in the 1926 election then defeated by Martin Luther Urquhart of the Liberal party in the 1930 federal election.

Electoral record

References

External links
 

1865 births
1937 deaths
Conservative Party of Canada (1867–1942) MPs
Members of the House of Commons of Canada from Nova Scotia